The Turoe stone is a granite stone decorated in a Celtic style located in the village of Bullaun, County Galway, Ireland, 6 km north of Loughrea off the R350 regional road. It probably dates to about the period 100 BC to 100 AD. The stone is positioned in a covered protective structure on the lawn in front of Turoe House, set in a concrete base surrounded by a metal cattle grill.
The Turoe stone is National Monument of Ireland Nr. 327 (NM#327)

Features
The top half of the stone is covered with a continuous abstract curvilinear La Tène style design similar to that on the Castlestrange Stone in County Roscommon.

History
The Turoe Stone was for centuries a curiosity at a lios, or fairy fort, some 3 km from Bullaun, but was moved to Turoe Farm in the late 19th century and so the historic provenance has been destroyed. The religious or ceremonial purposes of the stone are lost in time.

George Coffey, in his 1904 paper for the Royal Irish Academy on the subject of La Tène art, said that the stone had been moved in the 1850s from the rath of Feerwore site.

In 2007, a proposal to remove the Turoe Stone from its location near Loughrea due to concerns that the stone is becoming increasingly vulnerable to the elements, met fierce local opposition.

As of 7 July 2014, it had been temporarily removed from the Turoe Petting Farm for restoration and cleaning.

Excavations
The stone was originally outside the rath of Feerwore (Irish: Rath Férach Mhor) at the top of Turoe hill in Turoe townland. Excavation yielded much material suggesting that an open site dating to the late centuries BC had been later enclosed.

See also
Castlestrange Stone
Killycluggin Stone

References

External links
Megalith Ireland – Photographs and sketch of design on Turoe Stone
Ancient Ireland – Photographs of the Turoe Stone

Celtic art
Archaeological sites in County Galway
Megalithic monuments in Ireland
National Monuments in County Galway